Howard Brett Pollock (27 November 1942 – 22 July 1982) was an Australian rules footballer who played with Fitzroy in the Victorian Football League (VFL).

Notes

External links 

1942 births
1982 deaths
Australian rules footballers from Melbourne
Fitzroy Football Club players
People from Fairfield, Victoria